Dustin Sylvester (born January 5, 1989) is a Canadian professional ice hockey player. He is currently playing with EC Bad Nauheim of the DEL2.

Playing career
Prior to turning professional and undrafted, Sylvester played major junior hockey in the Western Hockey League with the Kootenay Ice. In his final season with the Blades in 2009–10, Sylvester scored 35 goals and 93 points in 68 games, before signing an amateur try-out contract with the Lake Erie Monsters in which he appeared in three American Hockey League games.

Slyvester signed a one-year contract in the German 2nd Bundesliga with EHC Freiburg on July 7, 2010. In the 2010–11 season, he led the league with 34 goals in only 48 games. On September 15, 2011, he returned to North America and signed an AHL contract with the Abbotsford Heat of the AHL.

During the 2011–12 season, Sylvester established himself on the second offensive line with the Heat, contributing with 34 points in 65 games to earn a one-year contract extension on July 3, 2012.

On June 19, 2013, Sylvester signed as a free agent for a second time in Europe with top Austrian league club, the Vienna Capitals on a one-year contract.

Career statistics

Regular season and playoffs

International

Awards and honours

References

External links

1989 births
Abbotsford Heat players
Canadian ice hockey centres
Dornbirn Bulldogs players
EHC Freiburg players
Ice hockey people from British Columbia
Kootenay Ice players
Lake Erie Monsters players
Living people
Sportspeople from Kelowna
Vienna Capitals players
Canadian expatriate ice hockey players in Austria
Canadian expatriate ice hockey players in Germany